The Cathedral of St Mary and All Saints, Harare is an Anglican cathedral in Zimbabwe. The cathedral, located at the intersection of Nelson Mandela Avenue and Sam Nujoma Street in Harare, was begun in 1913 to plans by British architect Herbert Baker; he also designed the cathedrals of Cape Town and Johannesburg.

History

Construction began under Frederic Beaven, bishop of Mashonaland, and the sanctuary and choir were completed in 1914. The sandstone structure was only finished in 1961. The cathedral features a bell tower with 10 bells which were cast in London. There are four chapels, dedicated to St George, St Mary, St Cecelia and the martyr Bernard Mizeki.

In 2012 a special service marked the return of the building to the Church of the Province of Central Africa after victory in a long-running legal battle with excommunicated former bishop Nolbert Kunonga, who had broken away from the CPCA in 2007 to form his own church. Kunonga and his supporters seized cars, churches, orphanages and other properties belonging to the CPCA. Eventually, the Supreme Court ruled that all the properties should be returned to the Anglican Diocese of Harare.

The present Bishop of Mashonaland is Chad Gandiya.

See also

Bishopslea Preparatory School

Anglican cathedrals in Zimbabwe
Herbert Baker buildings and structures
Buildings and structures in Harare
Churches completed in 1961